Castell Coch Woodlands and Road Section is a Site of Special Scientific Interest to the north of Cardiff, Wales, significant for both its biological and geological interest.

The SSSI (located at ) covers an area of  around the Victorian gothic castle of Castell Coch, 5 miles, 8 km north-west of Cardiff. The steep south and west facing slopes have extensive beech woodlands - thought to be the furthest west that such woods occur. The mature beech woodland supports a ground flora that reflects the ancient nature of the woodland, with bird's-nest orchid, butterfly orchid, dog's mercury, ramsons and sanicle locally abundant.

Geologically, the steep slopes reveal a sequence of rock bedding from the Devonian Old Red Sandstone into the Carboniferous Limestone. Unlike other exposures in South Wales, where the coal measures intervene, the lowest carboniferous limestone beds directly onto the older Devonian rocks. Much of the SSSI is open for public access, and adjoins the large area of Forestry Commission woodland known as Fforest Fawr.

References

See also
List of Sites of Special Scientific Interest in Mid & South Glamorgan

Sites of Special Scientific Interest in Cardiff